Tales of a Courtesan (Oirantan) is the third recording of the Toshiko Akiyoshi – Lew Tabackin Big Band.  It is also sometimes referred to by the title HANA KAI TAN in rōmaji listings of the Japanese album title.

All tracks from this album are also included on the 2008 Mosaic 3 CD compilation, Mosaic Select: Toshiko Akiyoshi - Lew Tabackin Big Band.

Track listing
All songs composed and arranged by Toshiko Akiyoshi:
LP side A
"Road Time Shuffle" – 6:28
"Tales of a Courtesan (Oirantan)" – 9:12
"Strive for Jive" – 7:50
LP side B
"I Ain't Gonna Ask No More" – 6:10
"Interlude" – 4:16
"Village" – 11:07

Personnel
Toshiko Akiyoshi – piano
Lew Tabackin – tenor saxophone, flute, piccolo
Tom Peterson – tenor saxophone, alto flute, clarinet
Dick Spencer – alto saxophone, flute, clarinet
Gary Foster – alto saxophone, soprano saxophone, flute, clarinet, alto clarinet
Bill Perkins – baritone saxophone, alto flute, bass clarinet
Bobby Shew – trumpet
Steven Huffsteter – trumpet
Mike Price – trumpet
Richard Cooper – trumpet
Jim Sawyer – trombone (on "Strive for Jive" and "Village")
Bill Reichenbach Jr. – trombone (except on "Strive for Jive" and "Village")
Charlie Loper – trombone
Britt Woodman – trombone
Phil Teele – bass trombone
Don Baldwin – bass
Peter Donald – drums
Guest Artist
King Errisson – congas (on "Village")

References / external links
RCA Victor Records RVC RVP-6004
U.S. album cover illustrator: Stanislaw Fernandes ©1976
Tales of a Courtesan... at [ Allmusic.com]

Toshiko Akiyoshi – Lew Tabackin Big Band albums
1976 albums